Glagolev is a Russian masculine surname; its feminine counterpart is Glagoleva. It may refer to
Aleksandr Glagolev (1872–1937), Russian Orthodox priest 
Alexandra Glagoleva-Arkadieva (1884–1945), Russian and Soviet physicist
Aleksei Glagolev (1901–1972), Ukrainian Orthodox priest
E. G. Glagoleva (1926–2015), Soviet and Russian mathematician
Vasily Glagolev (1896–1947), Soviet general
Vasily Glagolev (1883–1938), Soviet military commander
Vera Glagoleva (1956–2017), Soviet and Russian actress and film director

Russian-language surnames